The 1999 WTA Tour Championships, also known by its sponsored name The Chase Championships was a women's tennis tournament played on indoor carpet courts at the Madison Square Garden in New York City, New York in the United States. It was the 29th edition of the year-end singles championships, the 24th edition of the year-end doubles championships, and was part of the 1999 WTA Tour. The tournament was held from November 15 through November 21, 1999. Second-seeded Lindsay Davenport won the singles event and earned $500,000 first-prize money. The tournament discarded the best-of-five-set final which it had used since 1984 and reverted to a best-of-three-set final.

Finals

Singles

 Lindsay Davenport defeated  Martina Hingis, 6–4, 6–2.
 It was Davenport's 7th title of the year and the 26th of her career.

Doubles

 Martina Hingis /  Anna Kournikova defeated  Arantxa Sánchez Vicario /  Larisa Neiland, 6–4, 6–4.

Qualified players

Singles

Race to the finals
Players with a gold background have enough points to qualify, while players with a blue background did not but could play as alternates. A brown background means a player qualified but was unable to play due to injury or retirement.

References

External links
WTA tournament archive – 2000 Chase Championships draw (PDF)
WTA Finals history

WTA Tour Championships
WTA Tour Championships
WTA Tour Championships
WTA Tour Championships
1990s in Manhattan
WTA Tour Championships
Madison Square Garden
Sports competitions in New York City
Sports in Manhattan
Tennis tournaments in New York City